The Gultari Valley (Urdu:) (Old Name: Shingo Shigar) is amongst the biggest valleys of Baltistan, is located in south of Skardu. It comprises three valleys, Shingo, Shigar and Phultukus, with the majority of the people speaking the language Shina. These valleys are enclosed between the mountains of Himalaya. It has a total of 10 estates which contains many villages.
The valley has been divide into two parts for administrative purposes, e.g. Shingo Shighar and Gultari. The former comprises six small villages: Pato thali, Nogham, Akberabad, Ginyal, Matyal, and Thali. Similarly, the Gultari union includes some  10 villages as Gultari khas, Sumuluk, #Shawaran, Chamaluk, Franshat, Bunyal, Zaigham, Koner, Chundo, Thanote, Shakhma, Babachan, Fultuks (Matial, Haramel, Domial, Machikial, Uchi, Das, Barbat, Baikhial are small neighbourhoods of Fultuks).

Gultari valley is strategically important for Pakistan. But the area has been neglected by the government. Its population is around 10,000 . but, due to nonexistence of hospitals, schools and other basic needs of life, majority of people have migrated to cities like Skardu, Gilgit, Pindi or Karachi. The region is one of the coldest part of the country.

References

External links 
 Gilgit-Baltistan divided into three divisions, Express Tribune, 1 February 

Populated places in Skardu District